Mahmud Hasan Ripon is a Bangladesh Awami League politician and the incumbent Jatiya Sangsad member representing the Gaibandha-5 constituency since January 2023.

Career 
Ripon was elected the president of Bangladesh Chhatra League (BCL) during 2006–2011. For Gaibandha -5 by-election he got nomination from Awami league and won the election by defeating Jatiya Party-backed candidate AHM Golam Shaheed Ranju with a margin of 33,533 votes.

References 

Living people
Awami League politicians
11th Jatiya Sangsad members
Place of birth missing (living people)
Date of birth missing (living people)
People from Gaibandha District
Year of birth missing (living people)